In enzymology, an indole 2,3-dioxygenase is an enzyme that catalyzes the chemical reaction

indole + O2  2-formylaminobenzaldehyde

Thus, the two substrates of this enzyme are indole and O2, whereas its product is 2-formylaminobenzaldehyde.

This enzyme belongs to the family of oxidoreductases, specifically those acting on single donors with O2 as oxidant and incorporation of two atoms of oxygen into the substrate (oxygenases). The oxygen incorporated need not be derived from O2.  The systematic name of this enzyme class is indole:oxygen 2,3-oxidoreductase (decyclizing). Other names in common use include indole oxidase, indoleamine 2,3-dioxygenase (ambiguous), indole:O2 oxidoreductase, indole-oxygen 2,3-oxidoreductase (decyclizing), and IDO (ambiguous).  This enzyme participates in tryptophan metabolism.  It has 3 cofactors: copper, Flavin,  and Flavoprotein.

Indole dioxygenase is not specific to indole but rather operates on a broad range of indole derivatives, including the amino acids tryptophan and 5-hydroxytryptophan (5-HTP), and many indole-analog plant phytochemicals.  IDO is a peripheral enzyme, in contrast to tryptophan oxidase, an enzyme of similar amino acid sequence, which is active only in the liver.  IDO is induced (produced on demand) by activation of inflammatory processes involving cytokine expression by white blood cells.

References

 
 
 

EC 1.13.11
Copper enzymes
Flavoproteins
Enzymes of unknown structure